My Lawyer, Mr. Jo 2: Crime and Punishment is a 2019 South Korean television series starring Park Shin-yang and Go Hyun-jung. It is the sequel to the 2016 television series My Lawyer, Mr. Jo. It is based on the webcomic series Neighborhood Lawyer Jo Deul-ho by Hatzling (Kim Yang-soo). It aired from January 7 to March 26, 2019 on KBS2's Mondays and Tuesdays at 22:00 KST.

Synopsis
The sequel fast forward to 2019, returning with Jo Deul-ho, a once prosecutor turned lawyer, who is currently unemployed.

After a legal battle, his license is revoked for a short time, while his ex-wife and daughter leaves overseas. Being devastated with loss of his family and career, he leaves the industry for some peace of mind. Unbeknownst to him, troubles continue to follow him.

Cast

Main
 Park Shin-yang as Jo Deul-ho
 Go Hyun-jung as Lee Ja-kyung

Supporting
Lee Min-ji as Yoon So-mi
Joo Jin-mo as Yoon Jeong-geon
Seo Yi-sook as Shin Mi-sook
Jeon Bae-soo as Kang Ki-young
Byun Hee-bong as Kook Hyun-il
Son Byong-ho as Baek Do-hyun
Kim Bup-rae as Yoo Chang-ho
Jung Hee-tae as Park Woo-sung
Choi Seung-kyung as Kang Man-soo
Jo Dal-hwan as An Dong-chool
Lee Mi-do as Oh Jung-ja
Yoon Joo-man as Choi Hyung-tak
Kwon Hyuk as Kook Jong-seob
Jang Ha-ran as Kook Jong-hee
Jung Joon-won as Kook Jong-bok
Hong Kyung as Baek Seung-hoon
Moon Soo-bin as Han Min

Production
Kim Sae-ron was offered the role of Yoon So-mi.

Original soundtrack

Part 1

Part 2

Part 3

Part 4

Part 5

Part 6

Part 7

Part 8

Ratings
 In this table,  represent the lowest ratings and  represent the highest ratings.
 NR denotes that the drama did not rank in the top 20 daily programs on that date.
 N/A denotes that the rating is not known.

Awards and nominations

Notes

References

External links
  
 
 

Korean-language television shows
2019 South Korean television series debuts
2019 South Korean television series endings
Korean Broadcasting System television dramas
Television shows based on South Korean webtoons
South Korean legal television series
My Lawyer, Mr. Jo